Steven Dwain Williams (born March 7, 1991) is a former American football cornerback. He played college football at California. He was drafted by the San Diego Chargers in the fifth round of the 2013 NFL Draft.

Early years
Williams was born in Dallas, Texas.  He attended Skyline High School in Dallas.  He was a second-team Class 5A all-state selection as a senior, after his team finished 12-2 overall. He recorded 53 tackles, two interceptions and 10 pass breakups as a 2007 junior to earn second-team All-State and first-team All-District honors.  He helped his team to a 12-2 record and won the 5A Region II District 11 title. He was selected to play in the 2009 Under Armour All-America Game.

Considered a four-star recruit by Rivals.com, he was rated as the 24th best cornerback prospect of his class.

College career
Williams attended the University of California-Berkeley, where he played for the California Golden Bears football team from 2009 to 2012. During his career, he played in all 37 games possible with 28 starts during the final three seasons of his four-year career. He posted career totals of 150 tackles, 9.0 tackles for loss (-22 yards), 1.0 sack (-2 yards), six interceptions that he returned for 45 yards, 25 pass breakups, 31 passes defended and three forced fumbles. He entered the 2013 NFL Draft after his redshirt junior season.

Professional career

San Diego Chargers
On April 27, 2013, Williams was selected in the fifth round of the 2013 NFL Draft by the San Diego Chargers.

On August 26, 2013, he was placed on the Injured Reserve list due to a pectoral injury.

On September 14, 2014, Steve Williams made his NFL debut recording two tackles. Williams at times played as the nickel corner on nickel and sub packages. On December 20, 2014 against the San Francisco 49ers, Williams replaced an injured Shareece Wright. Williams recorded 4 tackles and 2 pass deflections.

On September 27, 2015 against the Minnesota Vikings, Williams caught his first career interception from Teddy Bridgewater who was throwing towards the end zone. On January 3, 2016, against the Denver Broncos, Williams recorded a sack, two forced fumbles, and an interception all in the same game.

On September 4, 2016, Williams was waived by the Chargers.

Los Angeles Rams
On September 9, 2016, Williams was signed by the Los Angeles Rams.
On September 23, 2016, Williams was waived by the Rams.

San Diego Chargers (second stint)
On October 5, 2016, Williams was signed by the Chargers. He was released by the Chargers on November 8, 2016.

Los Angeles Rams (second stint)
On November 23, 2016, Williams was signed by the Rams. He was released on December 21, 2016.

Salt Lake Stallions
In 2019, Williams joined the Salt Lake Stallions of the Alliance of American Football. The league ceased operations in April 2019.

Seattle Dragons
In October 2019, Williams was picked by the Seattle Dragons as part of the 2020 XFL Draft. He was placed on injured reserve on February 24, 2020. He had his contract terminated when the league suspended operations on April 10, 2020.

NFL career statistics

References

External links
 California Golden Bears bio
 San Diego Chargers bio

1991 births
Living people
American football cornerbacks
California Golden Bears football players
San Diego Chargers players
Under Armour All-American football players
Players of American football from Dallas
Los Angeles Rams players
Salt Lake Stallions players
Seattle Dragons players